The Garud Commando Force is the special forces unit of the Indian Air Force. It was formed in September 2004 and has a current strength of over 1500 personnel. The unit derives its name from Garuda, a divine bird-like creature in Hindu culture.

Garud forces are tasked with the protection of critical Air Force bases and installations; search and rescue during peace time and hostilities and disaster relief during calamities. Presently, Garuds are deployed in Congo as part of the UN peace keeping operations.

History 

After attempts by terrorists to attack two major air bases in Jammu and Kashmir in 2001, Indian Air Force commanders felt the need for a specialized force to protect these critical elements and to have a dedicated Commando Force trained in Special Forces techniques, Combat Search and Rescue, Reconnaissance, Counter Insurgency (COIN) Operations and Emergency in response to terror-threats to airfields.

While the Army might have provided some Special forces units to the Air Force, its units were always subject to being posted out on rotation to other areas as per the Army's requirements. It was felt that the specialized training the air force would have provided such units would have to be repeated again and again for the replacement units.

The initial plans mooted in October 2001 called for a specialized force with 2000 commandos. The group was originally called "Tiger Force", but was later renamed as "Garud Force".

In order to address the need for a dedicated force, in September 2003, the Government of India authorized a 1080 strong force to be raised and trained on the lines of the Para SF of the Army and MARCOS of the Indian Navy,  with the mandate of performing niche, Air Force specific operational tasks.

Soon after, the first batch of 100 volunteers from the IAF No.1 Airmen Training Center at Belgaum, Karnataka were earmarked to undergo Garud Training at Gurgaon. The Garuds were first unveiled on 6 February 2004, when the first batch of 62 "Air Commandos" passed out of training in New Delhi. The Garuds were first seen publicly during the Air Force Day celebrations at New Delhi on 8 October 2004.

In the aftermath of the Pathankot Terror Attack, Indian Air Force decided to raise ten additional squadrons of Garud commandos, comprising about 700 personnel, bringing the total strength of the force to 1780.

Responsibilities 
The mandated tasks of the Garuds include direct action, special reconnaissance, rescuing downed pilots in hostile territory, establishing airbases in hostile territory and providing air-traffic control to these airbases. The Garuds also undertake suppression of enemy air defenses and the destruction of other enemy assets such as radars, evaluation of the outcomes of Indian airstrikes and use laser designators to guide Indian airstrikes. The security of IAF installations and assets are usually performed by the Air Force Police and the Defence Security Corps even though some critical assets are protected by the Garuds.
Their airbase protection task also includes, when necessary, rendering inaccessible weapons systems and other assets by sealing them off. The tasks they perform also includes counter-terrorism, airborne assault, anti-hijacking, hostage rescue and assist civilian relief operations during calamities.

Organization 

Garud personnel are enlisted as airmen in the Indian Air Force. The Garud commandos are organised into fifteen 'flights'. These flights are deployed at air force stations. Each flight is led by an officer who holds the rank of a Squadron Leader or a Flight Lieutenant and is composed of around 60 to 70 men who usually operate in squads of 14 soldiers. The Garud Commando Force has a reported strength of over 1500 personnel as of 2017. A Wing Commander rank officer commands the force. Additional personnel are planned to be added to the force.

Training

Airmen Selection Process 

Unlike its counterparts in the Army and Navy, candidates for Garud Commandos are not selected from volunteers of other branches. Recruitment to the Garuds is done directly through airmen selection centres via advertisements.

Candidates found eligible for the force is put through a process of rigorous physical training. Candidates have only one chance to become a Garud trainee. Once a recruit completes training and meets required standards, he is absorbed into the Commando force and is retained in this stream throughout his career.

Wherever he is posted in the IAF, he will be part of a Garud Unit. This approach ensures that the Commando Force retains its highly trained men all through their career with the IAF.

The first batch of Officers for the Garuds were volunteers from the Cadets of the Ground Duty Officers course being trained at the Air Force Academy, Dundigal, Telangana. These officers on successful completion have been absorbed into Garud Force and will be permanently assigned to the force until the point they reach senior ranks and go for higher postings.

Training is also conducted at Commando Wing, Belgaum along with the Indian Army at their Infantry School (Junior Leaders Wing).

Training 

Garud trainees undergo a 72-week training. The Basic Training course, which is the longest among all the Indian special forces but it also includes basic training. The total duration of training before a trainee can qualify as a fully operational Garud is around 3 years.

The initial phase is a three-month probationary training which filters in the promising candidates for the next phases of training. This phase, which usually has a high attrition (Drop-out) rate is conducted at the Garud Regimental Training Centre located at Hindon, Ghaziabad near New Delhi.

The subsequent phase of special operations training is imparted by the Special Frontier Force, the Army's Para SF and NSG. Those who qualify, proceed to the Parachute Training School (PTS) at Agra to complete the basic airborne phase. Trainees are trained along with paratroopers of the Indian Army.

The remainder of the phases concentrates on niche fields like jungle and snow survival, demolition, etc. Garuds also train at the diving school of the Indian Navy and the Army's Counter Insurgency and Jungle Warfare School (CIJWS). The final phase of training is active operations on being attached to the Rashtriya Rifles of the Indian Army, which helps the Garuds in gaining operational experience.

After induction, the commandos also undergo advanced training including anti-hijack counter-insurgency training, jungle and snow survival techniques, specialized weapon handling and advanced diving skills.

Uniforms & Insignia 
Garud airmen wear the "Airman Beret Badge" on the cap. They are also parachute trained, and wear the para wings above the right pocket. The "Garud Force Patch" can be seen worn on the sleeve. The Garud Commando Badge, which was worn on the right pocket and resembles the NSG badge, is no longer in use. Instead they now have a Garud Winged Badge which is gold in colour and worn on the left chest, similar to where pilot/aircrew wings are worn.

The Garuds used to wear a black beret, instead of the traditional maroon beret of the other Indian Special Forces units, but now wear the maroon beret. They sport the operational paratroopers brevet on the right chest. The formation insignia is worn on the left shoulder. The Garuds are also entitled to wear "IAF GARUD" titles on the sleeves.

Operational deployments 

Very little is known about Garud commando operations and assignments, due to their classified nature. Garuds have been deployed to Congo as a part of the UN peacekeeping contingent. They also operate alongside special forces of the Indian Army in Jammu and Kashmir to gain operational exposure. Towards this purpose, teams from the flights are attached to Army SF units. The Garuds are now active in the region of Jammu and Kashmir carrying out counter insurgency operations and neutralising terrorists in the region. Garud commandos were tasked to provide security at the Yelahanka AFS during Aero India-2005, 2007, 2011 and 2013.

2013 Chhattisgarh helicopter shootdown 
On January 18, 2013, an IAF helicopter, with two Garud commandos as part of the security crew, while on a casualty evacuation sortie, was hit by 15 bullets fired by Naxalites and crashed in Sukma district, Chhattisgarh. A police radio operator, Yamlal Sahu, was wounded with bullets piercing his intestines.

2016 Pathankot attack 
On 2nd January 2016, during the 2016 Pathankot attack, a Garud team engaged the intruding terrorists in a firefight, during which Commando Gursewak Singh was martyred. All the IAF assets were declared safe.

Jammu and Kashmir 
Garud commandos are actively deployed in the Lolab Valley and the Hajin area of Jammu and Kashmir to conduct counter-insurgency operations. They have undertaken operations against armed militants from groups such as Lashkar-e-Taiba. These operations have included tasks such as direct encounters and intelligence gathering. The following are some of the known operations conducted by Garud commandos:
Operation Rakh Hajin: This was an operation conducted by Garud commandos in which six militants were killed in the Kashmir Valley. The Ashok Chakra was posthumously awarded to Corporal J.P. Nirala for the same.
In July 2018, two Garud commandos and two militants were killed during an intense encounter at Hajin, Bandipora. According to military authorities, the Garud commandos were operating alongside the Special Operations Group (SOG) of the J&K Police, and the Indian Army.

AFSOD deployments 
In November 2019, Garuds started operating as a part of the first deployment of the Armed Forces Special Operations Division in Jammu and Kashmir.

Ladakh 
Soon after the beginning of the 2020 China–India tensions, Garud commandos were deployed near mountain peaks considered by India to have strategic value. Their role was to defend the Indian airspace against Chinese aircraft for which they employed 9K38 Igla air defence systems.

Gallantry awards

Ashok Chakra
 Corporal Jyoti Prakash Nirala, AC (Posthumous) of Unit 617 was awarded in 2018, for displaying outstanding courage and killing 2 category ‘A’ terrorists and injuring 2 others, in an operation where 6 terrorists were killed, including nephew of Zaki-ur-Rehman Lakhvi in Bandipora, Jammu and Kashmir in 2017.

Vayu Sena Medal
Squadron Leader Rajeev Chauhan, Squadron Leader Dilip Gurnani and
Sergeant Shyam Veer Singh were simultaneously conferred the Vayu Sena Medal (2022) for serving in the Garud Commando Force, having been deployed in Jammu and Kashmir.

Equipment 
The following firearms are reportedly used by the Garud Commando Force:

Small arms

See also
 Special Forces of India
 Indian armed forces
 Indian military ranks
 Indian Air Force
 Armed Forces Special Operations Division (AFSOD)

References

External links 
 Garud Commando Force on Bharat Rakshak.
 Garuds: Where Eagles Dare in Sainik Samachar
 

Special forces of India
Military units and formations of the Indian Air Force
Air force special forces units
Counterterrorist organizations
2004 establishments in India